The String Trio in E-flat major, Op. 3 is a composition by Ludwig van Beethoven, his first for string trio (violin, viola and cello).

It is a divertimento consisting of six movements, including two minuets. It may have been first sketched while Beethoven was still living in Bonn. It was published in 1797 by Artaria in Vienna, and dedicated to the Countess of Browne, wife of his patron Count Johann Georg von Browne.

Structure

The six movements are:
 Allegro con brio
 Andante
 Menuetto: Allegretto
 Adagio
 Menuetto: Moderato
 Finale: Allegro

Transcriptions

Piano Trio (Hess 47)

Sometime prior to 1800, Beethoven arranged the first movement of the trio for piano, violin and cello (Hess 47): it has been speculated that the composer may have intended to transcribe the entire trio for the same forces but lost interest as the existing manuscript breaks off part way through a transcription of the second movement.

Cello Sonata Op. 64

The trio was arranged for cello and piano (Op. 64): this was first published in 1807 by Artaria. The arrangement is thought to be not by the composer, with Keith Anderson pointing out that Artaria's title sheet for the transcription simply implies that Beethoven was involved without explicitly stating that he was.

References
Notes

Sources

External links
 
 
  - Photographs of the manuscript of the incomplete transcription Hess 47.
  - Live performance video from a performance at the Midori Art Park.

String trios by Ludwig van Beethoven
1797 compositions
Music with dedications
Compositions in E-flat major